Destruction Derby is a vehicular combat racing video game developed by Reflections Interactive and published by Psygnosis. Based on the sport of demolition derby, the game tasks the player with racing and destroying cars to score points. The developers implemented simulated physics to make the results of collisions easier to predict, and they kept the game's tracks small to increase the number of wrecks. Versions of Destruction Derby were released for MS-DOS, PlayStation and Sega Saturn. A Nintendo 64 version, Destruction Derby 64, was released in 1999 by Looking Glass Studios and THQ. Critics found Destruction Derby enjoyable and they praised its graphics and car damage system, but the Nintendo 64 and Sega Saturn releases received mixed reviews. The game started the Destruction Derby franchise, beginning with its 1996 sequel, Destruction Derby 2.

Gameplay

Destruction Derby is a vehicular combat racing video game based on the sport of demolition derby. The game contains three vehicles. Collisions in the game affect the controls of each car, limiting their steering and maximum speed. Frontal collisions risk damage to the car's radiator, which causes the car to overheat and stop running. Four game modes are available: Destruction Derby, Wreckin' Racing, Stock Car Racing and Time Trial. In Destruction Derby, the player earns points by destroying other cars in a large, trackless arena called The Bowl; in Stock Car Racing, the player must finish in first place, and no points are awarded for destroying cars. Wreckin' Racing is a hybrid of the two, in which the player earns points both by winning the race and by destroying other cars. Time Trial is a solo time attack mode. The PlayStation version features system link play for two players, while the MS-DOS version has an online multiplayer mode.

Destruction Derby 64, the game's Nintendo 64 version, features updated graphics and an increased number of cars and tracks; and it adds new modes such as capture the flag. The game contains twenty-four cars and more than twelve courses. It also supports split-screen multiplayer for up to four players.

Development
The British development studio Reflections Interactive began creating Destruction Derby for the PlayStation in late 1994. It was published by Sony Computer Entertainment's Psygnosis branch, which allowed Reflections to receive PlayStation development kits long before that console's release. The game debuted at the May 1995 Electronic Entertainment Expo, and its initial title was variously reported as Demolition Derby and Demolish 'em Derby. Writers for Edge and Next Generation commented that the game could "trounce" Ridge Racer upon the PlayStation's release.

To make the results of car collisions easier to predict, Reflections implemented simulated physics into Destruction Derby. Director Martin Edmondson believed that the game would otherwise be "completely unplayable", as with "pool when the collisions are all off". Producer Tony Parks noted that the physics were simplified to improve performance and to compensate for the PlayStation's digital controller, and that the team sought a balance between "realism and playability". Performance was also improved by optimising the game's graphics, and by reducing the level of detail of objects in the distance. Destruction Derbys game engine supports up to twenty cars on screen simultaneously, which no console racing game, other than Daytona USA, had achieved until that time. However, a single wire-frame model, differentiated by texture maps, was used for every vehicle. Damage to vehicles is modelled in real-time, based on the speed and angle of the cars involved. The team made the game's tracks small to "keep the density of the cars on the track very high", which allowed for large-scale wrecks. Plans were made to support up to eight players with the PlayStation Link Cable.

Destruction Derby was published by Sega and developed by Perfect Entertainment for the Sega Saturn, as part of a deal that also brought Wipeout to the console.  This version lacks transparencies. GameFans Ryan Lockhart estimated that the port was "80% ready" in the magazine's August 1996 issue, and it was released in August 1996. A Nintendo 64 version of Destruction Derby was announced by the UK magazine CTW in 1998, alongside Nintendo 64 versions of Psygnosis games such as Wipeout and O.D.T.. Destruction Derby 64 was developed by Looking Glass Studios and published by THQ, under license from Psygnosis. At the time, Looking Glass head Paul Neurath said in a press release, "We are delighted to have teamed up with THQ for the launch of Destruction Derby 64". Aaron Boulding of IGN commented that the game "had a tough time just making it to the N64" during its 18 months in production, and noted that "development duties [...] passed from Psygnosis to Looking Glass Studios and publishing [was] picked up by THQ." The game was released in October 1999.

Reception

Writing for GamePro, Captain Squideo called Destruction Derby "the most raucous racing experience of the fall". He believed that its "graphics are almost all you could want for a game" of this type, but wrote that "nothing here stands out as graphically spectacular". He complained that the game does not let players customise cars, and he disliked its lack of split-screen multiplayer. He summarised, "Limited options keep Destruction Derby out of the winner's circuit, but this rowdy stock-car racer still generates a stadium full of thrashin' fun." Victor Lucas of The Electric Playground stated that "the beauty of the game" is the strategy involved in making "calculated strikes" against enemy vehicles, and he wrote, "If you go all out and try to make big noise on the track, more than likely you'll be limping to the scrap yard in seconds." He believed that the game's Stock Car racing mode "is no match for the white knuckle inertia of either Wipeout or Ridge Racer", and that the demolition derbies in The Bowl were "most fun to be had" in the game. He praised the game's graphics and physics, and concluded, "Destruction Derby is a winner in every capacity." A reviewer for Next Generation was extremely pleased with the concept of smashing into other cars, saying it taps into a near-universal fantasy. He remarked the single-player mode is indefinably "lacking" but the multiplayer offers unqualified enjoyment.

The PC port was also well-received. Lee Buchanan of PC Gamer US praised "the spectacular visuals that bring to life the most jarring collisions I've seen on a computer", and he noted that "[car] damage is depicted beautifully". Like Lucas, he wrote that the player "can't just mindlessly smash into other cars; this is thinking man's destruction". Although he found the game too easy "even at the toughest difficulty level", he found this to be a minor issue that did not detract from the experience. He considered the game's online play to be a high point, and he finished, "Destruction Derby is a blast, and a welcome change of pace from high-end driving simulations." Peter Olafson of Computer Gaming World called the game "a great simulation" of demolition derbies, and he wrote that the wrecks are "convulsive and realistic". He believed that the game "has never-before-seen quality that will instantly make it a showpiece game to demonstrate to open-mouthed friends and relatives", and he considered the car damage to be "especially marvelous—and unprecedented for this sort of game". However, he found that its "useful life span is surprisingly short" and he hoped for a track editor in its sequel. He summarised, "Despite its limitations, this is a great game, but it has a lot more potential." A reviewer for Next Generation remarked that while the game is a straight port of the PlayStation version, it is an impeccably accurate one. He applauded the authentic modelling of vehicle crashes, multiple modes, smoothness of gameplay, and inclusion of both network and modem options, and found the game's only downside is that the camera zooms out so little that it can be difficult to see nearby cars.

Reviewing the game's Sega Saturn version, Kim Randell of Computer & Video Games noted its "inferior graphics" that do not have "the sheen and glossiness of its PlayStation counterpart". Randell believed that it was made "much too late to cause the kind of sensation that WipEout did. Comparisons with the PlayStation version are inevitable, and the rather haphazard conversion means that the Saturn version lacks the polish of its rival." Rob Allsetter's review in Sega Saturn Magazine (from the same publisher as Computer & Video Games) recycled most of the text from Randell's review, including the closing remarks. Erik Reppen of Game Informer wrote that it "doesn't seem fair to compare" the Nintendo 64 release to the PlayStation version, and he complained that car damage does not hinder performance. He said that it would more accurately be described as "Destruction Derby Arcade". He found that the game was far too easy for "experienced racers and big fans of the franchise" to enjoy, and finished, "It was fun, but I wouldn't buy it." Aaron Boulding of IGN believed that Destruction Derby 64 came too long after the original version, and that it was "a shadow of the outdated PSX game". He complained about the "bland backgrounds and flat textures" and noted that the graphics are "grainy" and suffer from slowdown; but he enjoyed the car damage visuals. Boulding liked the split-screen multiplayer and called the new capture the flag mode the game's best aspect, but he concluded that "even [these elements] may not make it worth a rental".

GameFan'''s Levi Buchanan praised Destruction Derby 64 as "the best racer for the Nintendo 64 this year", and he lauded its "simplistic control" as a remedy for the complex controls that he believed had "ruined the PlayStation versions". He liked its graphics but wrote that its music "isn’t too hot". Buchanan enjoyed its multiplayer component and wrote that "the slowdown when all four join in is minima[l]—nice programming on the part of Looking Glass". Although he complained that the game's vehicle damage is not "segmented throughout your car", he concluded by calling the game "pure, unadulterated fun [that] has enough tracks and hidden vehicles to keep you playing for a very long time". Jeff Gerstmann of GameSpot wrote, "Graphically, Destruction Derby 64 surpasses the old PlayStation games by quite a bit - not that that is a particularly hard thing to do". He found that its framerate was adequate even in split-screen mode, and concluded that it was "a better game than its PlayStation counterparts". He finished, "Give it a rent next time you're rounding up the posse for a day of gaming."Destruction Derby spawned the Destruction Derby series, and was directly followed by Destruction Derby 2 in 1996. Later entries include Destruction Derby Raw (2000) and Destruction Derby: Arenas (2004), the last of which was developed by Studio 33. Destruction Derby was re-released through the PlayStation Network store in 2007.
The game was included on the PlayStation Classic.

Sales
The game sold more than 1 million copies by August 1996.

See also
 Demolition Racer FlatOut Wreckfest''

References

External links

1995 video games
DOS games
Looking Glass Studios games
Nintendo 64 games
PlayStation (console) games
Psygnosis games
Racing video games
Sega Saturn games
THQ games
Vehicular combat games
Split-screen multiplayer games
Multiplayer and single-player video games
Video games developed in the United Kingdom